Mikhail Popov is a paralympic athlete from Russia competing mainly in category T38 sprint events.

Mikhail competed in the 2000 Summer Paralympics where he won silver medals in both the 100m and 200m finishing behind Australia's Timothy Sullivan on both occasions.  He then returned in 2004 competing in the 100m, 200m and 400m making the final in all three but was unable to add to his medal tally.

References

Paralympic athletes of Russia
Athletes (track and field) at the 2000 Summer Paralympics
Athletes (track and field) at the 2004 Summer Paralympics
Paralympic silver medalists for Russia
Living people
Medalists at the 2000 Summer Paralympics
Year of birth missing (living people)
Paralympic medalists in athletics (track and field)
Russian male sprinters
20th-century Russian people
21st-century Russian people